Taitung Airport  is an airport serving Taitung City, in Taitung County, Taiwan. The airport operates from 7am to 6pm.

History
The airport sits on 153.7 hectares of land began as a holding room facility in 1977 and upgraded as an official airport on 1 July 1981. It then moved to its current site months later afterwards to meet the strategic requirements for the military. On 1 June 2001, it was promoted to become a second class airport, and in September it began its expansion construction to move industries eastwards and boost the local tourism industries. Since 2014, the school APEX flight academy is located on the airport.

Facilities

Airlines and destinations

Transportation
The airport is accessible within walking distance South East from Kangle Station of the Taiwan Railways.

See also

 Civil Aeronautics Administration (Taiwan)
 Transportation in Taiwan
 List of airports in Taiwan

References

External links
 Taitung Airport
 

1981 establishments in Taiwan
Airports established in 1981
Airports in Taitung County